Phallus minusculus is a species of fungus in the stinkhorn family. Found in Tanzania growing on decaying wood, it was described as new to science in 2002.

References

External links

Fungi described in 2002
Fungi of Africa
Phallales